Herbert R. Agocs (November 6, 1928 – September 15, 1990) was an American football player and coach.  He served as the head football coach at Montana State University from 1958 to 1962, compiling a record of 30–13–2.  Agocs also coached wrestling and track and taught  physical education at Montana State.

A native of Freemansburg, Pennsylvania, Agocs graduated from Liberty High School in Bethlehem, Pennsylvania in 1947.  He attended the University of Pennsylvania, where he played college football as an end from 1948 to 1950.  At Penn Agocs also lettered in wrestling and track.  He died at the age of 61 at his home in Bozeman, Montana on September 15, 1990.

Head coaching record

College

References

1928 births
1990 deaths
American football ends
Montana State Bobcats football coaches
Penn Quakers football coaches
Penn Quakers football players
Penn Quakers wrestlers
College wrestling coaches in the United States
Penn Quakers men's track and field athletes
Montana State Bobcats track and field coaches
Sportspeople from Northampton County, Pennsylvania
Players of American football from Pennsylvania